Schizothorax heterophysallidos is a species of ray-finned fish in the genus Schizothorax from the  upper reaches of the Nanpan River in Yunnan.

References 

Schizothorax
Fish described in 2009